This article lists those who were potential candidates for the Republican nomination for Vice President of the United States in the 2000 election. On March 7, 2000, Texas Governor George W. Bush won the 2000 Republican nomination for President of the United States, and became the presumptive nominee. On July 25, 2000, former Secretary of Defense Richard B. Cheney was chosen as his running mate.

The Bush–Cheney ticket would go on to defeat the Democratic tickets of Gore–Lieberman in 2000 and Kerry–Edwards in 2004.

Selection process 
Bush had initially chosen Dick Cheney to lead the search for his vice presidential running mate. In 1992, Bush had supported Cheney as a replacement for Dan Quayle on his father's ultimately unsuccessful national ticket. After more than three months of extensive research, Cheney recommended John Danforth to be the nominee, as the other choices' strengths were offset by liberal stances. Bush heavily considered Danforth, but ultimately asked Cheney himself to be the nominee.

By picking Cheney, Bush had a running mate who had years of experience as well as an extensive foreign policy expertise. After Cheney, who was serving as CEO of Halliburton, reported his findings back to Bush, Bush surprised pundits by asking Cheney himself to be his running mate. Bush told supporters that regional considerations would have less bearing on his decision than the candidate's ability to take over the office of the presidency. At the selection announcement, Bush said that Cheney, who had worked under all five presidential administrations between 1969 and 1993, was qualified, respected and shared his vision for America.

There was a short-lived movement to draft Elizabeth Dole, but that effort did not move forward.

Shortlist

Media speculation on George W. Bush's possible running-mates 
After his selection by Republican primary voters as presumptive presidential nominee, Bush asked Dick Cheney to lead the selection committee for his vice president nominee. As the vice presidential vetter, Cheney required at least 11 potential candidates to fill out "an extraordinarily detailed, 83-question form" delving into their backgrounds. This list includes names that had been mentioned in several sources as the candidates

Members of Congress

Governors

Other Individuals

See also
George W. Bush 2000 presidential campaign
2000 Republican Party presidential primaries
2000 Republican National Convention
2000 United States presidential election
List of United States major party presidential tickets

References

George W. Bush 2000 presidential campaign
Vice presidency of the United States
Dick Cheney